Victor Pavlovich Yakunin (born 18 January 1931) is a former Soviet-Russian diplomat who served as the Soviet Ambassador to Pakistan from 1985 until 1993. He was preceded by Vitaly S. Smirnov and his tenure is considered to be notable in the events including the death and state funeral of President Zia-ul-Haq and witnessing the general elections held in 1988 that saw Benazir Bhutto's becoming the Prime Minister of Pakistan, Soviet retreat from Afghanistan in 1989, and the normalization of foreign relations between Pakistan and Russia.

After the collapse of the Soviet Union in 1991, he was succeeded as Russian Ambassador to Pakistan and eventually retired from the diplomatic services in 1993.

During his tenure, he also successfully worked towards repatriation to Soviet soldiers held as POWs by the Afghan Mujaheedin and safely returning them back to Soviet Union in 1989–91.

References

External links

1931 births
Ambassadors of the Soviet Union to Pakistan
Ambassadors of Russia to Pakistan
Russian expatriates in Pakistan
Russian–Urdu translators
Living people